Sour Sally is a frozen yogurt franchise in Indonesia.

Founded by Donny Pramono and also as the current CEO.

In 2012, Sour Sally carried out business development by launching the Sour Sally Mini franchise. Sour Sally Mini comes with a 3x3 meter outlet concept located in non-premium places with high traffic and affordable products for the middle segment, in contrast to Sour Sally who is present in premium locations with a boutique outlet concept.

As of 2023, Sour Sally operates its boutique outlets in Medan, Jakarta, Bandung, Semarang, Yogyakarta, Surakarta, Surabaya, Bali, Banjarmasin and Makassar.

References

External links
Sour Sally company website

Fast-food franchises